Marta Marrero (born 16 January 1983), a Spanish former professional tennis player, is a professional padel player.

In tennis, she reached the quarterfinals of the French Open, won two WTA doubles titles, and also a total of 14 ITF singles and doubles titles. Her highest singles rank on the WTA Tour was world No. 47, which she reached in 2004. Her highest doubles ranking was No. 47, set in July 2005.

Since 2015 she is a professional padel player where she has attained a world No. 1 ranking as of 2019.

Career
Marrero turned professional in 1998. At the 2000 French Open, she reached the quarterfinals as a qualifier. In the second round, Marrero defeated Dominique Van Roost, who defeated number two seed Lindsay Davenport in the first round. Reaching the fourth round, she defeated Paraguay's Rossana de los Ríos in three sets. It was the first time in French Open history that two qualifiers met in the fourth round. In the quarterfinals, Marrero was defeated by eventual runner-up Conchita Martínez, 7–6, 6–1. At the 2001 French Open, she lost in the third round to Kim Clijsters, who finished runner-up.

2004 saw the Spaniard win Marrero first WTA doubles title in Sopot, Poland. In the final, she and Nuria Llagostera Vives defeated Klaudia Jans and Alicja Rosolska. In 2005, Marrero won her second (and last, to date) WTA doubles title. Partnering Antonella Serra Zanetti, the team, which was seeded fourth, defeated Daniela and Sandra Klemenschits in the final.

At the 2007 US Open, Marrero competed in the women's doubles competition with Selima Sfar. In the first round, Marrero and Sfar defeated Roberta Vinci and former world number one doubles player Paola Suárez in three sets. They lost in the second round, however, to Alicia Molik and Mara Santangelo, who were the 2007 French Open doubles champions.

Marrero announced her retirement from tennis in 2010, after struggling with injuries.

WTA career finals

Doubles: 5 (2 titles, 3 runner-ups)

ITF finals

Singles: 18 (9–9)

Doubles: 9 (5–4)

Grand Slam singles performance timeline

References

External links
 
 
 

1983 births
Living people
Sportspeople from Las Palmas
Spanish female tennis players
Female tennis players playing padel
21st-century Spanish women